This is a list of notable American venues where jazz music is, or has been, played. It includes jazz clubs, nightclubs, dancehalls and historic venues as well.

Alabama
 Carver Theatre, Birmingham

California

Los Angeles metropolitan area
 The Baked Potato, Studio City
 Billy Berg's, Hollywood
 Catalina Bar & Grill, Hollywood
 Donte's, North Hollywood
 Down Beat, Central Avenue
 Dunbar Hotel, Central Avenue
 The Haig, Hollywood
 Herb Alpert's Vibrato Grill & Jazz, Bel Air
 Jazz Bakery, Culver City
 Lighthouse Cafe, Hermosa Beach
 Lincoln Theater, Central Avenue
 Shelly's Manne-Hole, Hollywood
 Quality Cafe, Downtown

San Francisco Bay Area
 Black Hawk, Tenderloin, San Francisco
 Great American Music Hall, Tenderloin, San Francisco
 Keystone Korner, North Beach, San Francisco
 Kuumbwa, Downtown Santa Cruz, Santa Cruz
 Maybeck Recital Hall, Berkeley
 Jazz Workshop, San Francisco
 SF Jazz Center, San Francisco
 Yoshi's Jazz Club, Jack London Square, Oakland

District of Columbia
 Blues Alley, Georgetown, Washington
 Bohemian Caverns, U Street, Washington
 KC Jazz Club (Kennedy Center), Foggy Bottom, Washington

Georgia
 Eddie's Attic, Decatur

Hawaii 
 Blue Note Hawaii, Waikiki, Honolulu

Illinois

Chicago

Indiana
 Jazz Kitchen, Indianapolis

Louisiana
 Lulu White's Mahogany Hall, Storyville, New Orleans
 Maple Leaf Bar, Uptown, New Orleans
 Preservation Hall, French Quarter, New Orleans
 Snug Harbor, Faubourg Marigny, New Orleans
 Tipitina's, Uptown, New Orleans

Maryland
 Keystone Korner, Baltimore
 Sportsmen's Lounge, Baltimore

Massachusetts
 Iron Horse Music Hall, Northampton
 Ryles Jazz Club, Cambridge

Boston
 Hi-Hat
 Jazz Workshop
 Lulu White's
 Paul's Mall
Scullers Jazz Club, Allston 
 Southland 
 Storyville
 Wally's Cafe

Michigan

Detroit
 Baker's Keyboard Lounge
 Blue Bird Inn
 Cliff Bell's
 Orchestra Hall, or Paradise Theater

Minnesota
 Artists' Quarter, Twin Cities
 Dakota Jazz Club, Twin Cities

Missouri
 Subway Club, Kansas City
 Peacock Alley, St. Louis

Nebraska
 Dreamland Ballroom, North Omaha

New Jersey

Newark, New Jersey

New York

New York City

Manhattan

 52nd Street
 Downbeat Jazz Club
 Famous Door
 Hickory House
 Jazz Standard 
 Jimmy Ryan's
 Kelly's Stables
 Onyx Club
 Three Deuces

Bowery
 Five Spot

 Columbus Circle
 Dizzy's Club Coca-Cola (Jazz at Lincoln Center)

 East Village
 8BC

 Greenwich Village
 Arthur's Tavern
 Blue Note
 Boomer's
 The Bottom Line
 Café Bohemia
 Café Society
 Condon's
 The Cookery
 Nick's
 Smalls Jazz Club
 The Village Gate
 Village Vanguard

 Harlem
 Alhambra
 Apollo Theater, generally prior to the 1960s
 Baby Grand
 Cotton Club
 Lenox Lounge
 Lincoln Theater
 Minton's Playhouse
 Clark Monroe's Uptown House
 Savoy Ballroom
 Smalls Paradise

Lower East Side
 Slug's Saloon

Midtown Manhattan
 Birdland
 Carnegie Hall
 Iridium Jazz Club
 Metropole
 Roseland Ballroom

NoHo
 Studio Rivbea (see Sam Rivers)

SoHo
 Ali's Alley (see Rashied Ali)

Upper West Side
 Mikell's
 Smoke

Ohio
 Jazz Central, Dayton

Oregon
 Blue Monk, Portland
 Brasserie Montmartre, Portland
 Jack London Revue, Portland
 Jimmy Mak's, Portland

Pennsylvania
 Gullifty's, Squirrel Hill, Pittsburgh

Philadelphia
 Earle
 Lincoln Theater
 Pearl Theatre
 Showboat
 Zanzibar Blue

Tennessee
 The Palace, Memphis

Texas
 Caravan of Dreams, Fort Worth
 Sardines Ristorante Italiano, Fort Worth
 Señor Blues, El Paso

Virginia
 The Birchmere, Alexandria

Washington
 The Triple Door, Seattle
 Dimitriou's Jazz Alley, Seattle

See also
 Jazz club
 List of jazz festivals
 List of concert halls
 List of contemporary amphitheatres
 List of opera houses

References 

 
Jazz, United States
American music-related lists
Venues United States